is a railway station on the West Japan Railway Company Hanwa Line in Abeno-ku, Osaka, Osaka Prefecture, Japan. The station opened on July 18, 1929. When the platforms and the tracks were located on the ground, the station was located in Yamasaka Nichome, Higashisumiyoshi-ku.

History
 18 July 1929 - Station opens
 March 2018 - Station numbering was introduced with Minami-Tanabe being assigned station number JR-R22.

Layout
Minami-Tanabe Station has two elevated side platforms serving a track each.

Platforms

References

Abeno-ku, Osaka
Railway stations in Japan opened in 1929
Railway stations in Osaka